Iron(III) chloride describes the inorganic compounds with the formula (H2O)x. Also called ferric chloride, these compounds are available both in an anhydrous and hydrated forms.  They are common source of iron in the +3 oxidation state. The hydrate and the anhydrous derivative have distinct properties.

Structure and properties

All forms of ferric chloride are paramagnetic, owing to the presence of five unpaired electrons residing in 3d orbitals. This electronic configuration places electrons in molecular orbitals that are antibonding with respect to ligands.  Thus, iron(III) chlorides are labile, undergoing rapid ligand exchange in solution.  In contrast to their kinetic lability, iron(III) chlorides are thermodynamically robust, as reflected by the vigorous methods applied to their synthesis.

Anhydrous
The anhydrous compound is a crystalline solid with a melting point of 307.6 °C. The colour depends on the viewing angle: by reflected light the crystals appear dark green, but by transmitted light they appear purple-red. Anhydrous iron(III) chloride has the  structure, with octahedral Fe(III) centres interconnected by two-coordinate chloride ligands.

Iron(III) chloride has a relatively low melting point and boils at around 315 °C. The vapor consists of the dimer  (like aluminium chloride) which increasingly dissociates into the monomeric  (with D3h point group molecular symmetry) at higher temperature, in competition with its reversible decomposition to give iron(II) chloride and chlorine gas.

Hydrates
In addition to the anhydrous material, ferric chloride aggressively forms hydrates upon exposure to water, reflecting its Lewis acidity. Four of these hydrates have been crystallized and examined by X-ray crystallography.
dihydrate:  has the structural formula trans-.
 has the structural formula cis-.
 has the structural formula cis-.
hexahydrate:  has the structural formula trans-.

Solution

Thus, the chloride ligand significantly influences the optical properties of the iron center. According to spectroscopic measurements, the main species in aqueous solutions of ferric chloride are the octahedral  (stereochemistry unspecified) and the tetrahedral . The cationic aquo complex is strongly acidic:
 

Anhydrous iron(III) chloride dissolves in diethyl ether and tetrahydrofuran forming 1:2 adducts of the formula FeCl3(ether)2.  In these complexes, the iron is pentacoordinate.

Preparation
Several hundred thousand kilograms of anhydrous iron(III) chloride are produced annually. The principal method, called direct chlorination, uses scrap iron as a precursor:

The reaction is conducted at several hundred degrees such that the product is gaseous.  Using excess chlorine guarantees that the intermediate ferrous chloride is converted to the ferric state.  A similar but laboratory scale process also has been described.

Solutions of iron(III) chloride are produced industrially both from iron and from ore, in a closed-loop process.

Dissolving iron ore in hydrochloric acid

Oxidation of iron(II) chloride with chlorine

Oxidation of iron(II) chloride with oxygen and hydrochloric acid

Heating hydrated iron(III) chloride does not yield anhydrous ferric chloride. Instead, the solid decomposes into hydrochloric acid and iron oxychloride. Hydrated iron(III) chloride can be converted to the anhydrous form by treatment with thionyl chloride. Similarly, dehydration can be effected with trimethylsilyl chloride:

Reactions
The reactivity of ferric chloride reveals two trends: It is a Lewis acid and an oxidizing agent.

Lewis-acid reactions
Reactions of iron(III) chlorides reflect the description of iron(III) as oxophilic and a hard Lewis acid.  The rapidity of these reactions are consistent with the lability of ferric ion, reflecting its typical high-spin electronic configuration.  Thus, oxalate salts react rapidly with aqueous iron(III) chloride to give , known as ferrioxalate. Other carboxylate sources, e.g., citrate and tartrate, bind as well to give carboxylate complexes.  The affinity of iron(III) for oxygen ligands was the basis of qualitative tests for phenols. Although superceded by spectroscopic methods, the ferric chloride test is a traditional colorimetric test. The affinity of iron(III) for phenols is exploited in the Trinder spot test.

Myriad other manifestation of the oxophiliicty of iron(III) chloride are available. When heated with iron(III) oxide at 350 °C it reactions to give iron oxychloride:

Alkali metal alkoxides react to give the iron(III) alkoxide complexes. These products have more complicated structures that the anhydrous iron(III) chloride.

Iron(III) chloride forms a 1:2 adduct with Lewis bases such as triphenylphosphine oxide; e.g., .  The related 1:2 complex , has been crystallized from ether solution.  

Iron(III) chloride also reacts with tetraethylammonium chloride to give the yellow salt of the tetrachloroferrate ion.

In addition to these simple stoichiometric reactions, the Lewis acidity of ferric chloride enables its use in a variety of acid-catalyzed reactions as described below in the section on organic chemistry.

Redox reactions
Iron(III) chloride is a mild oxidizing agent. It serves as one-electron oxidant illustrated by its reaction with copper(I) chloride to give copper(II) chloride and iron(II) chloride.

In a comproportionation reaction, iron(III) chloride reacts with iron powder to form iron(II) chloride:

A traditional synthesis of anhydrous ferrous chloride is the reduction of FeCl3 with chlorobenzene:

Organometallic chemistry
The interaction of anhydrous iron(III) chloride with organolithium and organomagnesium compounds has been examined often.  These studies are enabled because of the solubility of FeCl3 in etherial solvents, which are compatible with the nucleophilic alkylating agents.  Such studies may be relevant to the mechanism of FeCl3-catalyzed cross coupling reactions.  The isolation of organoiron(III) intermediates requires low temperature reactions, lest the [FeR4]- intermediates degrade.  Using methylmagnesium bromide as the alkylation agent, salts of Fe(CH3)4]- have been isolated. Illustrating the sensitivity of these reactions, methyl lithium  reacts with iron(III) chloride to give lithium tetrachloroferrate(II) :

To a significant extent, iron(III) acetylacetonate and related beta-diketonate complexes are more widely used than FeCl3 as ether-soluble sources of ferric ion.  These diketonate complexes have the advantages that they do not form hydrates, unlike iron(III) chloride, and they are more soluble in relevant solvents.
Cyclopentadienyl magnesium bromide undergoes a complex reaction with iron(III) chloride, resulting in ferrocene:

This conversion, although not of practical value, was important in the history of organometallic chemistry where ferrocene is emblematic of the field.

Uses

Water treatment
In the largest application iron(III) chloride is used in sewage treatment and drinking water production as a coagulant and flocculant. This floc facilitates the separation of suspended materials, clarifying the water.

Iron(III) chloride is also used to remove soluble phosphate from wastewater. Iron(III) phosphate is insoluble and thus precipitates as a solid. One potential advantage to its use in water treatment, ferric ion oxidizes (deodorizes) hydrogen sulfide.

Etching and metal cleaning
It is also used as a leaching agent in chloride hydrometallurgy, for example in the production of Si from FeSi (Silgrain process by Elkem).

In another commercial application, a solution of iron(III) chloride is useful for etching copper according to the following equation:

The soluble copper(II) chloride is rinsed away, leaving a copper pattern. This chemistry is used in the production of printed circuit boards (PCB).

Iron(III) chloride is used in many other hobbies involving metallic objects.

Organic chemistry

In industry, iron(III) chloride is used as catalyst for the reaction of ethylene with chlorine, forming ethylene dichloride (1,2-dichloroethane): 

Ethylene dichloride  is a commodity chemical, which is mainly used for the industrial production of vinyl chloride, the monomer for making PVC.

Several reagents for organic synthesis have been developed based especially on anhydrous iron(III) chloride:
Ferric chloride on silica gel is a reagent that has high reactivity towards several oxygen-containing functional groups. When the reagent is dry, its acidity and high affinity for water lead to dehydration and pinacol-type rearrangement reactions. When the reagent is moistened, it instead induces hydrolysis or epimerization reactions. 
Ferric chloride on alumina is used to accelerate ene reactions.
Ferric chloride in conjunction with NaI in acetonitrile solution reduces organic azides to primary amines.
When mixed with sodium hydride, iron(III) chloride gives a hydride reducing agent. This reagent has been shown to convert alkenes and ketones into alkanes and alcohols, respectfully.

As a reagent in organic chemistry, iron(III) chloride has attracted interest for both its redox activity and its Lewis acidity.  Furthermore, because they are inexpensive and relatively nontoxic, iron chlorides have been widely examined. Illustrating it use as a Lewis acid, iron(III) chloride catalyses electrophilic aromatic substitution and chlorinations. In this role, its function is similar to that of aluminium chloride.  In some cases, mixtures of the two are used. Iron(III) chloride oxidizes naphthols to naphthoquinones:

Histology 
Iron(III) chloride is a component of useful stains, such as Carnoy's solution, a histological fixative with many applications. Also it is used to prepare Verhoeff's stain.

Safety 
Anhydrous iron(III) chloride is harmful, highly corrosive, and acidic.

Natural occurrence

 is also produced as an atmospheric salt aerosol by reaction between iron-rich dust and hydrochloric acid from sea salt. This iron salt aerosol causes about 5% of naturally-occurring oxidization of methane and is thought to have a range of cooling effects.

The clouds of Venus are hypothesized to contain approximately 1%  dissolved in sulfuric acid.

Notes

References

Further reading

Chlorides
Iron(III) compounds
Metal halides
Coordination complexes
Deliquescent substances
Dehydrating agents
Acid catalysts